Kal So-won (born 14 August 2006) is a South Korean child actress. She debuted with the television series Take Care of Us, Captain (2012) and is best known for starring in Miracle in Cell No. 7 (2013), one of the best-selling Korean films of all time.

Life and career

Kal So-won was born on 14 August 2006 in Seoul, South Korea. Her family consists of her parents and Kal Sun-woo, her younger brother who was born two years after. Kal is also the granddaughter of Jo Eun-il, a writer who is known for one of the best-selling series' "Baker Mom's 100 Point Diary" . Jo had also previously written pieces based on her granddaughter's life in the format of letters similarly to diary entries. She currently resides in Jeju Island and attends .

6-year-old Kal began her journey as a child actress following her debut acting role in Take Care of Us, Captain (2012). Her performance in the South Korean film, Miracle in Cell No. 7 (2013) gained her domestic recognition after becoming one of the best-selling Korean films of all time. Her role earned her numerous nominations and awards including "Best New Actress" at the Baeksang Arts Awards and Max Movie Best Film Awards, and notably made her the youngest nominee for the "Best New Actress" and "Best Actress" awards in the history of the Grand Bell Awards'. In February 2014, Kal signed an exclusive contract under YG Entertainment. She revealed amongst several candidates, she chose YG Entertainment as her first agency. In celebration, she had a meal with singers and actors including Big Bang, 2NE1, Cha Seung-won, and Yoo In-na. Under the agency, her credits include the television series' My Daughter, Geum Sa-wol (2015), Glamorous Temptation (2015), The Doctors (2016), The Legend of the Blue Sea (2016), and A Korean Odyssey (2017).

In 2015, Kal joined BigBang onstage and performed the intro to their single "Blue" at their MADE World Tour held in Seoul, South Korea. Kal also appeared as a guest performer for iKon during the first portion of their stage for the single "Love Scenario"  at the 2018 Continue Tour held in Seoul, South Korea.

Ambassadorship

Filmography

Film

Television series

Web series

Television show

Music video appearances

Awards and nominations

Notes

References

External links
 
 
 
 

Living people
2006 births
21st-century South Korean actresses
South Korean film actresses
South Korean television actresses
South Korean child actresses
YG Entertainment artists
Namyang Gal clan